The Labo Del Rio Bridge, over the Piedra River near Arboles, Colorado, was designed and built in 1913 by the Missouri Valley Bridge Company with steel by the Illinois Steel Company.  It is a Pratt through truss bridge.  It has also been known as Bridge over Piedra River.  The bridge cost the state $3,395.  It was listed on the National Register of Historic Places in 1985.

It was deemed significant as the oldest surviving roadway truss bridge over the Piedra River, as one of few surviving in the state built by the Missouri Valley Bridge Company, and as the oldest known through truss made for the State Highway Commission.  It is a six-truss bridge with an interesting,  transitional type of pin-/rivet- connection.

It first carried State Primary Road 15 in a crossing near Pagosa Springs;  it was moved later to cross the Piedra River at its current location, on the Southern Ute Indian Reservation in the southern part of Archuleta County.

References

Truss bridges in the United States
Bridges completed in 1913
Road bridges on the National Register of Historic Places in Colorado
Transportation buildings and structures in Archuleta County, Colorado
1913 establishments in Colorado
National Register of Historic Places in Archuleta County, Colorado
Steel bridges in the United States